Aldeatejada is a village and municipality in the province of Salamanca, western Spain, part of the autonomous community of Castile and León.

Geography
It is located only  from the city of Salamanca and as of 2016 there are 1,828 inhabitants.

The nearest village geographically is Vistaahermosa although lack of direct road connections means that the village is almost twice the distance away by road from Salamanca.

Demography
At present the village lies within a certain demographic prosperity within reach of the provincial capital, but increased  urban sprawl in recent years may mean that the village may become merged with the Salamanca conurbation in coming decades. In the time period of 15 years the population has nearly doubled between 1991 and 2006 with a population of 516 people in 1991 growing to an estimated 935 people in 2006.

References

External links
 https://web.archive.org/web/20070218001502/http://www.pueblos-espana.org/castilla+y+leon/salamanca/aldeatejada/

Municipalities in the Province of Salamanca